Deborah Forte is an American producer of family television series and movies, websites and digital media including Clifford the Big Red Dog, Clifford's Puppy Days, Maya & Miguel, WordGirl, The Magic School Bus, the series Goosebumps, Sony's films Goosebumps and Goosebumps 2: Haunted Halloween, Horrible Histories, Dragon, I Spy, The Baby-Sitters Club, The Golden Compass, and Astroblast. She created Scholastic Media, a division of Scholastic Inc.  She is the founder of Silvertongue Films and under that banner is currently producing a television adaptation of His Dark Materials.  She is attached to produce The 39 Clues and Spirit Animals for Universal and Clifford the Big Red Dog for Paramount. Her productions have won six Emmys, one Academy Award, the Humanitas Prize, and the Annenberg Public Policy Center Award for Outstanding Educational Program on a Commercial Broadcast Station.

Career
Forte began her career in publishing at Viking Press in 1976 before joining Scholastic Productions in 1984 as VP of new business development.

Forte became President of Scholastic Media in 1995 and is the lead creative and business executive overseeing all media production including two production studios (Weston Woods and Soup2Nuts), Scholastic Interactive, Scholastic Audio Books and Scholastic Media Marketing and Consumer Products. Forte formed Scholastic Entertainment, a part of Scholastic Media, in 1997.

At Scholastic, Forte has produced over 300 productions, which includes turning best-selling Scholastic book series Clifford the Big Red Dog, Dear America, I Spy, The Magic School Bus, Goosebumps, Animorphs and The Baby-Sitters Club into some of the longest running children's TV series.

Her feature film credits include the Goosebumps film (2015; Columbia Pictures),  The Indian in the Cupboard, Clifford's Really Big Movie, The Baby-Sitters Club, The Mighty and Tuck Everlasting. Forte produced The Golden Compass, an adaptation of Philip Pullman's critically acclaimed trilogy His Dark Materials, which won the 2008 Academy Award for Visual Effects.

She produced the 2018 film Mortal Engines, with Peter Jackson and Fran Walsh for Universal Pictures and will likely produce its TV re-adaptation. She also produced the TV re-adaptation of His Dark Materials.

Filmography

Television

Film

Awards and honors for production
 1 Oscar Award
 6 Emmy Awards
 1 Humanitas Prize 
 11 Cine Golden Eagle Awards 
 12 Parents' Choice Awards 
 4 Webby Awards
 1 National Education Association Award 
 1 American Women in TV and Radio's Gracie Award
 1 National Educational Media Network Golden Apple Award
 1 The Annenberg Public Policy Center Award
 1 Literacy in Media Award
   honored by The National Hispanic Federation
   honored by The National Wildlife Federation
   honored by The Environmental Protection Agency

Forte's productions have won over 100 industry awards, including those listed above.

In The New York Times article, "At Scholastic, Turning Books Into the Stuff Of Multimedia", a colleague at Scholastic described her creative direction, by saying, "She takes tremendous care in seeing that our products get developed with the qualities that made them popular in the first place and making sure the new products are right for kids, educationally, developmentally and from an entertainment point of view."  In Fast Company's Spring 2014 interview, "How Scholastic Kept Its Relevance in a Digital World", Forte shared that, “We have developed our brand so that it’s relative and meaningful to children when they want to read, when they want to watch and when they want to play."   Fast Company remarked that the Bottom Line from her interview was, "Scholastic’s secret sauce is the development of a complementary media strategy across a variety of mediums, without losing focus on the company’s mission.  "

Personal life
Forte was a founding member of the Board of Trustees of the Children's Museum of Manhattan and currently serves on the board of the American Center for Children and Media and the International Emmys. She is a member of the National Academy of Television Arts and Sciences as well as the British Academy of Film and Television Arts.

A native of Newton, Massachusetts, Forte graduated from Hamilton College and lives in New York with her husband, Peter Stone, and their two sons.

References

General references

External links

"Deborah Forte '75 Producer The Golden Compass", story at Hamilton College website

American television producers
American women television producers
American film producers
Living people
Year of birth missing (living people)
21st-century American women